The throat is the anterior part of the neck'

Throat or Throats may also refer to:

 Throat, the corner at the front of the head of a four-sided sail
 Throat, the constricted or narrow part of a passage, especially a pipe
 Throat, as in the freebore of a firearm.
"Lump in one's throat", see Globus pharyngis
 Throat halyard, after that part of the sail it acts on
 Throat singing (disambiguation)

See also
 
 
 Gular (disambiguation)